The Men's +105 kilograms weightlifting event at the 2012 Summer Olympics in London, United Kingdom, took place at ExCeL London.

Summary
Total score was the sum of the lifter's best result in each of the snatch and the clean and jerk, with three lifts allowed for each lift.  In case of a tie, the lighter lifter won; if still tied, the lifter who took the fewest attempts to achieve the total score won.  Lifters without a valid snatch score did not perform the clean and jerk.

Ukraine's Artem Udachyn and Azerbaijan's Velichko Cholakov were on the start list but did not compete. 

Matthias Steiner was injured during the snatch portion of the competition when he attempted to pull 196 kg and was hit in the neck by the barbell. Steiner had to abandon the competition as a result of his injury.

Schedule
All times are British Summer Time (UTC+01:00)

Records

Results

References 

Results 

Weightlifting at the 2012 Summer Olympics
Men's events at the 2012 Summer Olympics